"Crushed by the Wheels of Industry" is a song by the British synthpop band Heaven 17, released in 1983 as the fifth and final single from their second studio album The Luxury Gap. It was written by Glenn Gregory, Ian Craig Marsh and Martyn Ware, and produced by Marsh and Ware (as British Electric Foundation) and Greg Walsh. It reached No. 17 in the UK and spent seven weeks on the chart. It would be the band's last Top 20 hit in the UK until 1992's "Temptation (Brothers In Rhythm Remix)".

Critical reception
Upon release, Tom Hilbert of Smash Hits commented: "Highly entertaining pop funk with sardonic 'woo-woos' and a cynical jab at society in general. Witty dance music with gormless backing chants and a piano that is everything that Shakatak isn't." Number One wrote: "Thankfully Heaven 17 have finally clicked and make dance records that you can actually dance to (unlike "Penthouse and Pavement"). Now their stylish sound is pure nourishment for the feet, as well as for the head and heart." Paul Simper for Number One said: "The threesome did work pretty hard at getting a hit before with fine dance records like "Penthouse and Pavement" and "Play to Win"; "Crushed By the Wheels" is along similar lines and though still less than great it's easily the best of the three they've made as popstars."

Formats
7" single
"Crushed by the Wheels of Industry (Part I)" - 3:43
"Crushed by the Wheels of Industry (Part II)" - 3:15

12" single
"Crushed by the Wheels of Industry (Parts I & II - Uninterrupted single version)" - 6:58
"Crushed by the Wheels of Industry (Album version)" - 5:55
"Crushed by the Wheels of Industry (Extended dance version)" - 6:21

12" single (US release)
"Crushed by the Wheels of Industry (Industrial Mix)" - 6:54
"Crushed by the Wheels of Industry (Album version)" - 5:51
"Crushed by the Wheels of Industry (Dub version)" - 6:17

12" single (Canada release)
"Crushed by the Wheels of Industry (The Industrial version)" - 6:52
"Crushed by the Wheels of Industry (The Extended dance version)" - 6:20

Personnel
Heaven 17
 Glenn Gregory - vocals
 Martyn Ware - synthesizers, backing vocals, producer
 Ian Craig Marsh - synthesizers, producer

Additional personnel
 Greg Walsh - producer, engineer

Charts

References

1983 singles
Heaven 17 songs
Songs written by Martyn Ware
Songs written by Glenn Gregory
Songs written by Ian Craig Marsh
1983 songs
Virgin Records singles